South Carolina Highway 544 (SC 544) is a  major four-lane state highway in Horry County, South Carolina. It connects the Surfside Beach and Conway areas. The highway is sometimes known as Dick Pond Road in the Socastee area.

Route description

SC 544 begins at an intersection with U.S. Route 17 Business (US 17 Bus.) northeast of Surfside Beach and ends at US 501 Bus. in Red Hill, near Conway. SC 544 is one of the most frequently traversed highways in the Myrtle Beach metropolitan area. It travels in a south–north direction and parallels US 501 for most of its route.

History
 Part of the current routing of SC 544 was the first route between Conway and Myrtle Beach, built in the late 1930s. When the Intracoastal Waterway was dug, the Socastee Swing Bridge in Socastee, South Carolina was also built. US 501 was signed on this route from Conway running south to Socastee. At Socastee, the road followed an east–west direction along the current route of SC 707 through Socastee, continuing through the area that is currently the Myrtle Beach International Airport, and ending near downtown Myrtle Beach on the road that is now Broadway Street. A more direct (and wider) route running diagonally between Conway and Myrtle Beach was built in the early 1960s, replacing a disused road through the former Conway Bombing and Gunnery Range. US 501 was signed on this path, and SC 544 and SC 707 were created to replace the old route of US 501.

A new bridge to be used in addition to the Socastee Swing Bridge was built in 1993. At that time, SC 544 was routed on this new road, and the former road was named Dick Pond Road in reference to a former lake near the intersection of US 17 Business and the route.

Public meetings by the South Carolina Department of Transportation took place in September 1999 to discuss the widening of SC 544 to a four-lane highway from US 501 in Conway to the Intracoastal Waterway, including sidewalks and gutters throughout most of the route. A 90-foot right-of-way was required for the expansion, and the Federal Highway Administration approved the Finding of No Significant Impact report in January 2000. In February 2001, the road was named in honor of Corporal Dennis Lyden, who was killed on the road in June 2000. Limited areas of six lanes were constructed near the intersection with Phase II of S.C. Highway 31, approved for construction in January 2002.

SC 544 is notable for traversing through many diverse areas of the Myrtle Beach metropolitan area, including Coastal Carolina University, several golf courses, many suburban bedroom communities, historic Socastee, and the tourist-oriented areas near Surfside Beach and the Atlantic Ocean.

Major intersections

Special routes

Red Hill connector route 1

South Carolina Highway 544 Connector (SC 544 Conn.) is a  connector route in the northern part of Red Hill. It is unnamed and is an unsigned highway.

It begins at an intersection with the SC 544 mainline. There is no access from SC 544 to SC 544 Conn., since it is blocked by barricades. It travels nearly due north and immediately intersects Cox Ferry Road, which is the western terminus of a separate connector route. Then, it intersects U.S. Route 501 (US 501). Here, US 378 Truck, US 701 Truck, and SC 90 Truck begin a concurrency with the connector route. An intersection with the eastern terminus of El Paso Drive leads to Waccamaw Elementary School. The highway curves to the northeast and reaches its northern terminus, an intersection with US 501 Business (US 501 Bus.). Here, the roadway continues as French Collins Road. Also, the truck routes turn left onto the business route.

Red Hill connector route 2

South Carolina Highway 544 Connector (SC 544 Conn.) is a  connector route in the northern part of Red Hill. It is named Cox Ferry Road but is an unsigned highway. It begins at an intersection with a different connector route. Here, Cox Ferry Road continues to the west-southwest. The highway travels to the east-northeast and immediately intersects the SC 544 mainline. The highway then travels through a residential area before reaching its eastern terminus, an intersection with U.S. Route 501 (US 501). Here, Cox Ferry Road continues past the terminus.

See also

References

External links

 
 SC 544 at Mapmikey's South Carolina Highways Page on the Virginia Highways Annex

544
Transportation in Horry County, South Carolina
Conway, South Carolina
U.S. Route 501